Joseph Bruff Seth (November 25, 1845 – November 23, 1927) was an American politician, lawyer and business executive. He served in the Maryland House of Delegates in 1874 and from 1884 to 1886. In 1886, he served as Speaker of the Maryland House of Delegates. Seth served in the Maryland Senate and as President of the Maryland Senate from 1906 to 1908.

Early life
Joseph Bruff Seth was born on November 25, 1845, in Bay Hundred District of Talbot County, Maryland to Martha A. (née Haddaway) and Alexander Hamilton Seth. His father was a farmer and served in the Maryland House of Delegates in 1844. Seth was educated in public schools. In 1860, Seth attended a boarding school, but returned home in 1861 due to the American Civil War and was tutored privately. In 1865, Seth worked with his uncle, Robert L. Seth, in the oyster and fruit packing business. Seth was admitted to the bar in 1867.

Career
Seth joined the law firm of John M. Frazier in Baltimore. After the death of Frazier in 1870, Seth, his brother T. Alexander Seth and Harry E. Mann conducted a law firm. In 1871, Seth returned to Talbot County and practiced law in the courts there.

Seth was a Democrat. Seth served in the Maryland House of Delegates in 1874 and from 1884 to 1886. He served as Speaker of the Maryland House of Delegates in 1886. Seth served in the Maryland Senate from 1906 to 1908. He served as the President of the Maryland Senate from 1906 to 1908.

In 1884, Seth was appointed by Governor Robert M. McLane as Judge Advocate General. He was re-appointed by Governors Lloyd and Jackson. In 1890, Seth was appointed as Commander of the State Fishery Force and held that position until July 1903.

Seth organized and served as the first president of the Baltimore and Eastern Shore Railway. He served as manager of the railway for six years. He also helped obtain a charter for the emergency hospital in Easton, and served as president of the hospital's organization for seven years. In 1890, Seth joined a group that organized an electric light plant in Annapolis. He was elected as president, and also served as director of the Annapolis Short Line Railroad. 

Seth served as mayor of Easton, Maryland from 1914 to 1916. Seth was in favor of Prohibition.

Personal life
Seth married Sallie Goldsborough Barnett on December 10, 1878. She died in August 1881. They had one son, John Barnett Seth. Seth married Mary Rhett Walker in June 1892.

In 1881, Seth purchased the Bromwell farm in Oxford Neck, Talbot County.

Seth died on November 23, 1927, at his home in Easton.

References

External links

 Maryland State Art Collection – Joseph B. Seth

1845 births
1927 deaths
People from Talbot County, Maryland 
People from Easton, Maryland 
Speakers of the Maryland House of Delegates
Presidents of the Maryland State Senate
19th-century American lawyers
20th-century American lawyers
19th-century American railroad executives
20th-century American railroad executives
Mayors of places in Maryland